The Structure of Crystals is a 1969 Polish film directed by Krzysztof Zanussi. It is his debut feature, and it won the Mermaid Award at the Warsaw Film Festival.

Plot
Jan and Marek were once physicist colleagues, but Jan left academia and became a meteorologist in a small rural town. Marek, who remained a scientist in the city, visits Jan and entreats him to return to scientific research and urban living. A spirited conversation ensues about values and ways of living.

Cast
  − Anna
  − Marek
 Jan Mysłowicz − Jan
 
 Adam Dębski
 Daniel Olbrychski

References

External links
 
 

Polish drama films
1969 films
Films directed by Krzysztof Zanussi
Films scored by Wojciech Kilar
1960s Polish-language films
1969 drama films